Limón, commonly known as Puerto Limón (Port Lemon in English), is a district, the capital city and main hub of Limón Province, as well as of the Limón canton in Costa Rica. Part of the community traces its roots to Italian, Jamaican and Chinese laborers who worked on a late nineteenth-century railroad project that connected San José to Puerto Limón. Until 1948, the Costa Rican government did not recognize Afro-Caribbean people as citizens and restricted their movement outside Limón province. As a result of this travel ban, this Afro-Caribbean population became firmly established in the region, which influenced decisions not to move even after it was legally permitted. Nowadays, there is a significant outflow of Limón natives who move to the country's Central Valley in search of better employment and education. The Afro-Caribbean community speaks Spanish and Limonese Creole, a creole of English.

Puerto Limón contains three port terminals, Moín Container Terminal, Port of Limón and Port of Moín, which permit the shipment of Costa Rican exports as well as the anchoring of cruise ships. In 2016, the government pledged ₡93 million ($166,000) for a new cruise ship terminal for Puerto Limón.

Health care is provided for the city by Hospital Dr. Tony Facio Castro. Two small islands, Uvita Island and Isla de Pájaros, are just offshore.

Toponymy  

Limón is the Spanish word for lemon. Puerto is the Spanish word for port (or harbor).

History

Colonization  

Christopher Columbus first dropped anchor in Costa Rica in 1502 at Isla Uvita, just off the coast of Puerto Limón. The Atlantic coast, however, was left largely unexplored by Spanish settlers until the 19th century.

As early as 1569, Governor Perafán de Rivera gave extensive plots of land, Indians included, in Matina to aristocrats (hidalgos) that helped to finance and support early conquest. Because these aristocrats found out that only a few Indians were available to exploit, they acquired African slaves to plant these lands with cocoa trees (the only feasible crop in these lands). These lands provided the only source of income to the absentee owners from the capital city of Cartago. Matina gained importance because of the cacao and the presence of African slaves, which made them attractive to pirate incursions.

Notorious pirates, Edward Mansvelt and his vice admiral Henry Morgan, arrived at Portete, a small bay between Limón and Moín, in 1666. They proceeded inland to Cartago, the capital of Costa Rica at the time, but were driven away by the inhabitants at Turrialba on15 April. The pirate army left on16 April and arrived back in Portete on23 April. They left Costa Rica and did not return.

Founding 

The town was officially founded in 1854 by Philipp J. J. Valentini under government auspices.
In 1867, construction began on an ambitious railroad connecting the highlands to the sea. Limón was chosen as the site of a major port, which would facilitate exports of coffee from the Central Valley.

Recent history 

Twenty-three residents of Limón working on the docks lost their lives on3 July 1942, when the cargo ship they were unloading was torpedoed by U-boat  and sank fast at the bottom of the port. Most of the crew was ashore and only one perished.

As a district, Limón was last modified on10 August 1992, by Decreto Ejecutivo 21515-G.

Puerto Limón was struck by the 1991 Limon earthquake, which affected the surrounding landscape and coastline.

The city has one main hospital.

Limón has three port areas.

Geography 

Locations 

 Barrios:Bellavista, Bohío, Bosque, Buenos Aires, Cangrejos, Cariari, Cerro Mocho, Cielo Amarillo, Cieneguita, Colina, Corales  Cruce, Fortín, Garrón, Hospital, Jamaica Town, Japdeva, Laureles, Limoncito, Lirios, Moín, Piuta, Portete, Pueblo Nuevo, San Juan, Santa Eduvigis, Trinidad, Veracruz
 Poblados:Buenos Aires, Cocal, Dos Bocas, Empalme Moín, Milla Nueve, Santa Rosa, Valle La Aurora, Villas del Mar Uno, Villas del Mar Dos, Villa Hermosa

Climate  

Limón features a trade wind tropical rainforest climate (Af) under Köppen's climate classification. Common to all cities with this climate, Limón has no consistently dry season.

Demographics 

, Limón had a population of  inhabitants.

Afro-Costa Rican  

The first officially acknowledged arrival of African people who arrived in Costa Rica came with the Spanish conquistadors. Slave trading was common in all the countries conquered by Spain, and in Costa Rica, the first Africans seem to have come from specific sources in Africa Equatorial and Western regions. The people from these areas were thought of as ideal slaves because they had a reputation for being more robust, affable, and hard-working than other Africans. The enslaved were from what is now the Gambia (Wolof), Guinea (Malinké), Ghanaian (Ashanti), Benin (specifically Ije / Ararás), and Sudan (Puras). Many of the enslaved were also Minas (i.e. communities from parts of the region extending from Ivory Coast to the Slave Coast), Popo (imported tribes such as Ana and Baribas), Yorubas and Congas (perhaps from Kongasso, Ivory Coast). Enslaved Africans also came from other places, such as neighboring Panama. Throughout the centuries, but especially after the emancipation of the slaves in 1824, the black population mixed with other ethnic groups, notably the Indians, and became part of the mainstream culture and ethnicity.

The early black population of Matina and Suerre in Limón is not the same population that arrived in the second half of the 19th century. This latter population did not arrive as slaves but as hired workers from Jamaica, and smaller groups from Barbados and Trinidad and Tobago. This is the reason why the majority of the current black population of Costa Rica has English surnames and speaks English with a Jamaican accent.

In 1910, Marcus Mosiah Garvey travelled to Puerto Limón, where he worked as a time-keeper for the United Fruit Company for some months, observing that the population of African descent suffered poor conditions.

The descendants of Africans in Costa Rica have endured discrimination including a delay in voting rights and a restriction on their movements.

Celebrations 

Puerto Limón is famous in Costa Rica for its yearly fall festival called Carnaval which occurs the week of12 October, the date Columbus first anchored off Limón's coast in 1502, on his fourth voyage. The event was started by local community leader and activist, Alfred Josiah Henry Smith (known as "Mister King"), who helped organize the first Carnaval in October 1949. The event stretches about a week (across two weekends), and includes a parade, food, music, dancing, and, on the last night, a concert in the Parque Vargas headlined by a major Latino or Caribbean music act. Previous artists have included Eddy Herrera (2002), Damian Marley (2003), El Gran Combo de Puerto Rico (2005), and T.O.K. (2006).

Although the show goes on rain or shine, the event has recently suffered some setbacks. Organizers cancelled Carnaval in 2007 due to a major dengue fever outbreak, and again in 2008 due to major municipal trash-removal issues and related health worries. While trash removal had long been an issue due to lack of trucks and a  haul to the nearest landfill (in Pococí), the ordered closure of this and other landfills in 2007 meant Puerto Limón had to send trash  to Alajuela and pay a higher disposal fee. The situation led to a bottle-neck in trash removal, which, combined with the major dengue breakout, caused organizers to cancel 2008's carnaval as a precautionary measure. Given the severity of the situation, the city bought land in nearby Santa Rosa and, in April 2009, opened its landfill (called El Tomatal). Given the improved situation, Carnaval picked up in 2009 after its two-year hiatus.

Transport

Road transportation 

The district is covered by the following road routes:
  National Route 32
  National Route 36
  National Route 240
  National Route 241
  National Route 257

Airport 

The Presidency Ministry announced in June 2011 that Sansa Airlines would begin regular scheduled flights four times a week to Limón Airport, beginning in July and costing ₡30,000–₡75,000 ($60–$150), to increase tourism to Limón Province.

Sports 

The city's football team is Limón F.C., after a local businessman took over the franchise of Asociacion Deportiva Limonense. They play their home games at the Estadio Juan Gobán.

Notable people

Activism

Business

Film and television

Literature

Politics

Sports

American and Canadian football

Boxing

Football

Track and field

Sister city 

  Galați, Romania (since 1997)

Gallery

References

External links 

 
 

Districts of Limón Province
Populated places in Limón Province
Port cities in the Caribbean
Populated places established in 1854
1854 establishments in Costa Rica